Daturadiol is a pentacyclic triterpenoid found in Datura species including Datura stramonium and Datura innoxia. It is also found in non-Solanaceae plants such as Vernicia fordii and Terminalia brasiliensis.

See also 
 Anisodamine
 Daturaolone
 Oleanane

References 

Triterpenes
Diols